Stones Corner is an inner southern suburb of City of Brisbane, Queensland, Australia.

Geography 

Stones Corner is centred on the junction of Logan Road and Old Cleveland Road.

History

The area was originally known as Burnett's Swamp, being low-lying land around the flood-prone Norman Creek. The triangle of land (the "corner") at the south-east of the junction of Logan Road and Old Cleveland Road was purchased by James Stone in 1875. He tried to get a licence to operate a hotel at the location but was unsuccessful so he brewed and sold ginger beer instead. The area took the name Stone's Corner as a result and later became a suburb with that name.

The present Stones Corner Hotel was opened on the site in 1888 as the Junction Hotel by Denis O'Connor.

On Sunday 10 August 1913, a new Catholic church at Stones Corner was dedicated by Archbishop James Duhig.

In 1931, the Annerley Church of Christ commenced outreach into Stones Corner, but the initiative was not successful and it ceased after a few years.

Stones Corner Library opened on 25 January 1950. It had a major refurbishment in 1996.

In 1975, the suburb of Stones Corner was absorbed into the neighbouring suburb of Greenslopes before officially returning to a suburb of its own in November 2017.

Amenities 
The Brisbane City Council operates the Stones Corner Library at 280 Logan Road.

Heritage Site
 286 Logan Road: Stones Corner Air Raid Shelter

References

External links

 

Suburbs of the City of Brisbane